The tawny pipit (Anthus campestris) is a medium-large passerine bird which breeds in much of the central Palearctic from northwest Africa and Portugal to Central Siberia and on to Inner Mongolia. It is a migrant moving in winter to tropical Africa and the Indian Subcontinent. The scientific name is from Latin. Anthus is the name for a small bird of grasslands, and the specific campestris means  "of the fields".

It is very similar to Richard's pipit, but is slightly smaller, has shorter wings, tail and legs and a narrower dark bill. It is also less streaked. Its flight is strong and direct, and it gives a characteristic "schip" call, higher pitched than Richard's.

Its song is a short repetition of a loud disyllabic chir-ree chir-ree.

In south Asia, in winter some care must be taken to distinguish this from other large pipits which winter or are resident in the area, including Richard's pipit, Blyth's pipit and paddyfield pipit. Tawny pipit is insectivorous, like its relatives.

The breeding habitat is dry open country including semi-deserts. The nest is on the ground, with 4-6 eggs being laid.

In culture

The plot of the 1944 film Tawny Pipit is about the rare event of a pair of tawny pipits breeding in England. Eric Hosking's footage of the pipits was actually of meadow pipits because he could not get genuine tawny pipits from German-occupied Europe.

References

External links
Ageing and sexing (PDF; 3.2 MB) by Javier Blasco-Zumeta & Gerd-Michael Heinze

tawny pipit
Birds of Europe
Birds of Central Asia
Birds of Western Asia
Birds of Africa
tawny pipit
tawny pipit